Feldebrő is a village in Heves county in Hungary.

Settings
Feldebrő  stands in the valley of the Tarna River, at the southeastern foot of the Mátra Mountains. Nearby villages include Vécs, Aldebrő, Tófalu, Kerecsend, Egerszólát, and Verpelét. The village belongs to the Archdiocese of Eger.

Origin of the name of the village

The name of the village comes from the Hungarian word debrő "broad valley." It may be related to the Slavic dialect term debra "floodplain."

Sightseeing
During the Árpád period the village belonged to the Aba family. It may have been one of that family's principle seats, given that a Hungarian king was buried in the church. The original church in the form of a Greek cross was built in the 11th century; it contained the tomb of King Samuel Aba of Hungary. The building was later transformed into a three-nave church, but the original crypt was preserved.

References
 Henszlmann, Imre (1876): Magyarország ó-keresztyén, román és átmeneti stylü mű-emlékeinek rövid ismertetése, (Old Christian, Romanesque and Transitional Style Architecture in Hungary). Királyi Magyar Egyetemi Nyomda, Budapest 
 Gerő, László (1984): Magyar műemléki ABC. (Hungarian Architectural Heritage ABC.) Budapest
 Gerevich Tibor: Magyarország románkori emlékei. (Die romanischen Denkmäler Ungarns.) Egyetemi nyomda. Budapest, 1938.

External links
 Feldebrő Official Homepage
 European vine tours poratl
 Feldebrő on Vendégváró homepage
 Feldebrő in the szeporszag.hu homepage
 Aerial photos
 Feldebrő – railway station

Romanesque architecture in Hungary
Populated places in Heves County